In algebraic geometry, Proj is a construction analogous to the spectrum-of-a-ring construction of affine schemes, which produces objects with the typical properties of projective spaces and projective varieties. The construction, while not functorial, is a fundamental tool in scheme theory.

In this article, all rings will be assumed to be commutative and with identity.

Proj of a graded ring

Proj as a set
Let  be a graded ring, whereis the direct sum decomposition associated with the gradation.

Proj as a topological space

Indeed, if  are a family of ideals, then we have  and if the indexing set I is finite, then .

Equivalently, we may take the open sets as a starting point and define
 

Proj as a scheme
As in the case of the Spec construction there are many ways to proceed: the most direct one, which is also highly suggestive of the construction of regular functions on a projective variety in classical algebraic geometry, is the following.

 

(where  denotes the subring of the ring of fractions  consisting of fractions of homogeneous elements of the same degree) such that for each prime ideal  of :

 

The sheaf associated to a graded module
This sheaf is quasicoherent by construction. If  is generated by finitely many elements of degree  (e.g. a polynomial ring or a homogenous quotient of it), all quasicoherent sheaves on  arise from graded modules by this construction. The corresponding graded module is not unique.

The twisting sheaf of Serre

It can be checked that  is in fact an invertible sheaf.

If we define

 

Likewise, for any sheaf of graded -modules  we define

 

This suggests, though erroneously, that  can in fact be reconstructed from these sheaves; ashowever, this is true in the case that  is a polynomial ring, below. This situation is to be contrasted with the fact that the spec functor is adjoint to the global sections functor in the category of locally ringed spaces.

Projective n-space

Examples of Proj

Proj over the affine line 
If we let the base ring be , thenhas a canonical projective morphism to the affine line  whose fibers are elliptic curves except at the points  where the curves degenerate into nodal curves. So there is a fibrationwhich is also a smooth morphism of schemes (which can be checked using the Jacobian criterion).

Projective hypersurfaces and varieties 
The projective hypersurface  is an example of a Fermat quintic threefold which is also a Calabi–Yau manifold. In addition to projective hypersurfaces, any projective variety cut out by a system of homogeneous polynomialsin -variables can be converted into a projective scheme using the proj construction for the graded algebragiving an embedding of projective varieties into projective schemes.

Weighted projective space 

Weighted projective spaces can be constructed using a polynomial ring whose variables have non-standard degrees. For example, the weighted projective space  corresponds to taking  of the ring  where  have weight  while  has weight 2.

Bigraded rings 
The proj construction extends to bigraded and multigraded rings. Geometrically, this corresponds to taking products of projective schemes. For example, given the graded ringswith the degree of each generator . Then, the tensor product of these algebras over  gives the bigraded algebrawhere the  have weight  and the  have weight . Then the proj construction giveswhich is a product of projective schemes. There is an embedding of such schemes into projective space by taking the total graded algebrawhere a degree  element is considered as a degree  element.

Global Proj
A generalization of the Proj construction replaces the ring S with a sheaf of algebras and produces, as the result, a scheme which might be thought of as a fibration of Proj's of rings.  This construction is often used, for example, to construct projective space bundles over a base scheme.

Assumptions
Formally, let X be any scheme and S be a sheaf of graded -algebras (the definition of which is similar to the definition of -modules on a locally ringed space): that is, a sheaf with a direct sum decomposition

 

where each  is an -module such that for every open subset U of X, S(U) is an -algebra and the resulting direct sum decomposition

 

is a grading of this algebra as a ring.  Here we assume that .  We make the additional assumption that S is a quasi-coherent sheaf; this is a “consistency” assumption on the sections over different open sets that is necessary for the construction to proceed.

Construction
In this setup we may construct a scheme  and a “projection” map p onto X such that for every open affine U of X,

 

This definition suggests that we construct  by first defining schemes  for each open affine U, by setting

 

and maps , and then showing that these data can be glued together “over” each intersection of two open affines U and V to form a scheme Y which we define to be .

The twisting sheaf

Proj of a quasi-coherent sheaf 

Let  be a quasi-coherent sheaf on a scheme . The sheaf of symmetric algebras  is naturally a quasi-coherent sheaf of graded -modules, generated by elements of degree 1. If  is of finite type, then its canonical morphism  is a projective morphism.

In fact, every closed subscheme of a projective  is of this form.

Projective space bundles

Indeed, if we take an open cover of X by open affines  such that when restricted to each of these,  is free over A, then

 

and hence  is a projective space bundle. Many families of varieties can be constructed as subschemes of these projective bundles, such as the Weierstrass family of elliptic curves. For more details, see the main article.

Example of Global Proj 
Global proj can be used to construct Lefschetz pencils. For example, let  and take homogeneous polynomials  of degree k. This can be described explicitly as the projective morphism .

See also
Projective space
Algebraic geometry of projective spaces
Projectivization

References

 
 

Scheme theory